The National Supercomputing Center in Shenzhen houses the second fastest machine in China, and the third fastest in the world. In May 2010 the Nebulae computer in Shenzhen placed second on the TOP500 supercomputer list, after the Cray computer at the Oak Ridge National Laboratory in Tennessee.

See also 

Supercomputer centers in China

References

Bibliography

External links
 National Supercomputing Center in Shenzhen

Shenzhen
Computer science institutes in China
Science and technology in China
Supercomputer sites
Supercomputing in China